…Live… is the twelfth album by Klaus Schulze. It was originally released in 1980, and in 2007 was the twenty-sixth Schulze album reissued by Revisited Records. The album contains recordings from concerts in Berlin in 1976 (according to record sleeve, but may actually be a studio recording from 1977), and Amsterdam and Paris in 1979. The CD version of "Sense" has been extended from the original LP and now includes a lengthy introduction which did not feature in the original release. "Dymagic" includes a vocal performance by Arthur Brown, similar to the one found on Dune, the last studio album before the tour.

Track listing

Personnel
 Klaus Schulze – synthesizers
 Harald Grosskopf – drums (on "Sense")
 Arthur Brown – vocals (on "Dymagic")

External links
 ...Live... at the official site of Klaus Schulze
 

Klaus Schulze live albums
1980 live albums
Inside Out Music live albums